Strange but true may refer to:

Literature 
 "Strange but True", an 1856 poem by Hugh Miller
 Strange but True: From the Files of Fate Magazine, a 2002 book edited by Corrine Kenner and Craig Miller
 Strange but true, a 2005 novel by John Searles

Music 
 Strange but True (album), a 1998 album by Jad Fair & Yo La Tengo
"Strange but True", a 1988 song by Times Two
"Strange but true", a song by Prince from Rave Un2 the Joy Fantastic

Television and film 
 Strange but True?, 1993–97 documentary television series hosted by Michael Aspel
 "Strange but True", the 2004 pilot episode of the Weird U.S. reality television series
 Strange but True (film), a 2019 American noir-thriller